Royal Gothenburg Yacht Club (GKSS) is a yacht club in Gothenburg, Sweden. It was founded in 1860. Royal Gothenburg Yacht Club resides in Långedrag and Marstrand.

Royal Gothenburg Yacht Club organises Stena Match Cup Sweden.

References

Royal yacht clubs
 
1860 establishments in Sweden
Sports clubs established in 1860
Sports clubs in Gothenburg
Yacht clubs in Sweden